The Women's United States Squash Open 2014 is the women's edition of the 2014 United States Open (squash), which is a WSA World Series event Platinum (prize money: $115 000). The event took place at the Daskalakis Athletic Center in Philadelphia, Pennsylvania in the United States from the 11th of October to the 18th of October. Nicol David won her third US Open trophy, beating Nour El Sherbini in the final.

Prize money and ranking points
For 2014, the prize purse was $115,000. The prize money and points breakdown was as follows:

Seeds

Draw and results

See also
United States Open (squash)
WSA World Series 2014
Men's United States Open (squash) 2014

References

External links
WSA US Open 2013 website
US Squash Open official website

Women's US Open
Women's US Open
Women's US Open
United States Open
Women's United States Open (squash)
Squash tournaments in the United States
Squash in Pennsylvania